Hillcrest High School is a public high school located in Midvale, Utah, and is part of the Canyons School District. Hillcrest High School is the only school in the Canyons School District that offers the International Baccalaureate Program, and one of only three high schools in the valley to do so - the others being Highland High School and Skyline High School.

History
Hillcrest High School opened its doors to students in the fall of 1962 as the third operating high school in the Jordan School District at the time.

Athletics

Utah State High School championships

Boys
 Basketball: 1968 and 1980
 Baseball: 1980, 1981, 1982, and 1983
 Cross country: 1972 and 1980
 Tennis: 1990
 Track: 1981, 1982, 1983, and 1986

Girls
 Basketball: 1976, 1979, 1982, and 1983
 Cross country: 1982
 Drill team: 1999, 2001, 2002, 2003, 2008, 2009, and 2016
 Gymnastics: 1985, 1988, and 1989
 Tennis: 2003 and 2004
 Track: 1974, 1975, 1982, and 1983
 Volleyball: 1973 and 1975

Notable alumni
Zane Beadles (2005) - NFL player for the San Francisco 49ers since 2016; played for Jacksonville Jaguars until 2014; played for Denver Broncos until 2013
Josh Savage (1999) - former NFL player for the Tennessee Titans and New Orleans Saints
Scott Young (1999) - former NFL player for the Philadelphia Eagles and Cleveland Browns
Al van der Beek (1991) - producer and songwriter with the musical group The Piano Guys
Richard Dutcher (1982) - actor, director, writer, and producer

References

External links

Official Hillcrest High School website
Canyons School District
Hillcrest IB Website
Unofficial Hillcrest Booster website
Hillcrest football results since 1980

Public high schools in Utah
Educational institutions established in 1962
Schools in Salt Lake County, Utah
International Baccalaureate schools in Utah
Midvale, Utah
1962 establishments in Utah